Lăng Cô is a township (thị trấn) in Phú Lộc District, Thừa Thiên Huế Province, Bắc Trung Bộ, Việt Nam. It has a well known beach and resort.

References

External links

Lang to To Da nang Transfer 

Beaches of Vietnam
Landforms of Thừa Thiên Huế province
Populated places in Thừa Thiên Huế province